Dance of Death, also called Danse Macabre, is a late-medieval allegory of the universality of death.

Dance of Death or The Dance of Death may also refer to:

Books
 Dance of Death, a 1938 novel by Helen McCloy
 Dance of Death (Stine novel), a 1997 novel by R. L. Stine
 Dance of Death (novel), a 2005 novel by Douglas Preston and Lincoln Child

Theatre and film 
 The Dance of Death (Strindberg play), a 1900 play by August Strindberg
 The Dance of Death, a 1908 play by Frank Wedekind
 The Dance of Death (Auden play), a 1933 play by W. H. Auden

Film
 The Death Dance, a 1918 drama starring Alice Brady
 The Dance of Death (1912 film), a German silent film
 The Dance of Death (1919 film), an Austrian silent film
 The Dance of Death (1938 film), crime drama starring Vesta Victoria; screenplay by Ralph Dawson
 The Dance of Death (1948 film), French-Italian drama based on Strindberg's play, starring Erich von Stroheim
 The Dance of Death (1967 film), a West German drama film
 Dance of Death or House of Evil, 1968 Mexican horror film starring Boris Karloff
 Dance of Death (1969 film), a film based on Strindberg's play, starring Laurence Olivier
Dance of Death (1979 film), a Hong Kong film featuring Paul Chun

Music
 Dance of Death (album), a 2003 album by Iron Maiden, or the title song
 The Dance of Death & Other Plantation Favorites, a 1964 album by John Fahey
 The Dance of Death (Scaramanga Six album)
 "Death Dance", a 2016 song by Sevendust

See also
 Dance of the Dead (disambiguation)
 Danse Macabre (disambiguation)
 Bon Odori, a Japanese traditional dance welcoming the spirits of the dead
 La danse des morts, an oratorio by Arthur Honegger
 Totentanz (disambiguation)